Visiting Texture is an album by Trio 3, a jazz group consisting of saxophonist Oliver Lake, bassist Reggie Workman and drummer Andrew Cyrille. It was recorded at Studio Peter Karl in Brooklyn, New York in July 2016, and was released in 2017 by Intakt Records.

Reception

In a review for All About Jazz, John Sharpe called the album a "splendid outing," and wrote: "Looking back, you can see the attraction of having a pianist exploit pockets of space in the overall fabric, but by keeping intact the ambiguity such spaciousness confers, the rewards are even greater. So much so that it's difficult to pick out the single collective piece from the six compositions contributed by individual band members. That's because often they merely sketch out the written material, which gives a delicious feel of hidden structure without revealing too much of how it's achieved."

Derek Taylor, writing for Dusted Magazine, stated: "As accommodating as the three players are to collaborators, a back-to-basics approach centering on their core association serves them well here."

Track listing

 "Bumpe" (Lake) – 5:40
 "Bonu" (Lake) – 6:08
 "Composite" (Cyrille/Lake/Workman) – 6:40
 "Epic Man" (Cyrille) – 7:47
 "Stick" (Lake) – 4:56
 "A Girl Named Rainbow" (Ornette Coleman) – 7:00
 "7 for Max" (Cyrille) – 2:52
 "Visiting Texture" (Workman) – 10:42

Personnel 
 Oliver Lake – alto saxophone
 Reggie Workman – bass
 Andrew Cyrille – drums

References

2017 albums
Trio 3 (free jazz trio) albums
Intakt Records albums